The ruddy treerunner (Margarornis rubiginosus), is a passerine bird which is endemic to the highlands of Costa Rica and western Panama.

This treerunner is found in hills and mountains from 1200 m up to the timberline, in forests and adjacent edges and clearings. It builds a large enclosed oval nest 25 m high in the crown of a tree on the underside of a thick branch. The nest is camouflaged with mosses and epiphytes and has a downward pointing entrance tunnel at its base. The eggs are undescribed, but members of this family typically lay two white eggs.

The adult ruddy treerunner is 16 cm long, weighs 18 g and looks like a small, short-billed woodcreeper, but has soft, rather than rigid, tail spines. It has bright rufous upperparts and a white supercilium. It has a white throat and otherwise tawny underparts. Young birds are almost identical to the adults. The call is a sharp tsit, and the song is a twittering trill.

The ruddy treerunner forages for large insects, spiders and their eggs and larvae in mosses, plant debris, bromeliads and other epiphytes.  It creeps along branches and up stems - but uses its tail for support less than a woodcreeper does. It is seen alone, in pairs, or as part of a mixed-species feeding flock.

References

 Daniel J. Mennill and Stéphanie M. Doucet, First description of the nest and eggs of the ruddy treerunner (Margarornis rubiginosus)) Cotinga 24 (2005): 109—110
 Stiles and Skutch,  A guide to the birds of Costa Rica  

ruddy treerunner
Birds of Costa Rica
Birds of Panama
ruddy treerunner
ruddy treerunner